Juan Manuel Florido Pellón (born 24 January 1975) is a Spanish rower. He competed in the men's lightweight coxless four event at the 1996 Summer Olympics.

References

External links
 

1975 births
Living people
Spanish male rowers
Olympic rowers of Spain
Rowers at the 1996 Summer Olympics
Sportspeople from Seville